X500 may refer to:
 X500 glofiish, a cellphone by former Taiwanese electronics manufacturing company E-TEN
 X.500, a series of computer networking standards 
 X500 (film), a Canadian-Colombian-Mexican coproduced drama film released in 2016